The Dore Holm is a small uninhabited islet off the south coast of Esha Ness, located in the north-west of Mainland, Shetland, Scotland. Its natural arch can be seen from the coast between Tangwick and Stenness. The shape of the arch has been compared to a horse drinking deeply from the water.

The name appears to be derived from 'door', the word 'holm' being of Scandinavian origin and meaning a small island.

Sources

This article incorporates text from Shetlopedia

Uninhabited islands of Shetland
Northmavine